Cardionema is a genus of flowering plants belonging to the family Caryophyllaceae.

Its native range is Western North America to Chile.

Species:

Cardionema andina 
Cardionema burkartii 
Cardionema camphorosmoides 
Cardionema congesta 
Cardionema kurtzii 
Cardionema ramosissima

References

Caryophyllaceae
Caryophyllaceae genera